Mikhail Kukushkin was the defending champion but lost in the first round to Nicolás Jarry.

Jiří Veselý won the title after defeating Federico Delbonis 5–7, 6–1, 7–5 in the final.

Seeds

Draw

Finals

Top half

Bottom half

External Links
Main Draw
Qualifying Draw

UniCredit Czech Open - Singles
2017 Singles